KWAX (91.1 FM) is a non-commercial classical music radio station in Eugene, Oregon, broadcasting to the Eugene-Springfield, Oregon area.  The station is a listener supported service of the University of Oregon. Some programming is spoken word: Episodes of My Word! and My Music were broadcast Sunday afternoons, until their discontinuation.

History
KWAX started out in the late 1950s as a student managed and operated FM station, with studios and transmitter on the top floor of Villard Hall.  The initial transmitter was 10 watts, and hours of operation were somewhat irregular.  In 1966, a local FM station gave the university their old 250-watt transmitter when they upgraded.

Repeaters and Translators
KWAX is simulcast on the following stations and translators:
88.5 FM in Redmond, Oregon (KWRX) 
91.5 FM in Florence, Oregon

References

External links

KWAX official website

WAX
Classical music radio stations in the United States
WAX
University of Oregon
Radio stations established in 1955
1955 establishments in Oregon